Anna Christy is an American soprano opera singer.  She studied at Rice University's Shepherd School of Music and University of Cincinnati College-Conservatory of Music and made her debut in 2000 at New York City Opera as Papagena.

Christy sings a variety of lyric roles, such as Susanna, Papagena and Cleopatra, but especially coloratura roles such as Cunegonde in Candide and Oscar in Un ballo in maschera. She made her Metropolitan Opera debut in the 2004/5 season, and has sung with the Santa Fe Opera in Bright Sheng's Madame Mao, Lyric Opera of Chicago, San Francisco Opera, L'Opéra National de Paris, and the Royal Opera House, London. She has also performed Bianca in Rossini’s Bianca e Falliero with the Washington Concert Opera.

In February 2010 she reprised her original 2008 interpretation of the title role in Donizetti's Lucia di Lammermoor for English National Opera.

References
Notes

External links
Dominic McHugh, "Interview: Barry Banks and Anna Christy on ENO's first-ever Lucia di Lammermoor" online at MusicalCriticism.com, 7 February 2008
Antony Lias, "Opera Britannia Interview: Anna Christy" online at www.opera-britannia.com, 5 February 2010
Official website, Anna Christy

University of Cincinnati – College-Conservatory of Music alumni
American operatic sopranos
Living people
Place of birth missing (living people)
Year of birth missing (living people)
Rice University alumni
21st-century American women opera singers